St Michael and All Angels is a Church of England parish church that stands on Bounds Green Road in Wood Green within the London Borough of Haringey. This church is not to be confused with the original St Michael at Bowes that used to stand in Palmerston Road before it was demolished and restored to a much smaller church and hall in the 1980s.

The church was designed by George Gilbert Scott and built in 1843. Alterations designed by H Curzon were made in 1865. The chancel and tower were added in 1874. The building is grade II listed.

References

Bibliography

External links

Bounds Green Road
Wood Green
Diocese of London
George Gilbert Scott buildings
Grade II listed churches in London
Wood Green